Hubert Höhne (born 29 November 1938) is a German water polo player. He competed in the men's tournament at the 1964 Summer Olympics.

References

1938 births
Living people
German male water polo players
Olympic water polo players of the United Team of Germany
Water polo players at the 1964 Summer Olympics
Sportspeople from Magdeburg